Sahlavar (also Romanized as Sahlāvar; also known as Sarlāvar) is a village in Nakhlestan Rural District, in the Central District of Kahnuj County, Kerman Province, Iran. At the 2006 census, its population was 781, in 167 families.

References 

Populated places in Kahnuj County